Onithochiton neglectus subantarcticus is a subspecies of chiton in the family Chitonidae.

References
 Powell A. W. B., New Zealand Mollusca, William Collins Publishers Ltd, Auckland, New Zealand 1979 

Chitonidae
Chitons of New Zealand